Many works of fiction have featured UFOs. In most cases, as the fictional story progresses, the Earth is being invaded by hostile alien forces from outer space, usually from Mars, as depicted in early science fiction, or the people are being destroyed by alien forces, as depicted in the film Independence Day. Some fictional UFO encounters may be based on real UFO reports, such as Night Skies. Night Skies is based on the 1997 Phoenix UFO Incident.

UFOs appear in many forms of fiction other than film, such as video games in the Destroy All Humans! or the X-COM series and Halo series and print, The War of the Worlds or Iriya no Sora, UFO no Natsu. Typically a small group of people or the military (which one depending on where the film was made), will fight off the invasion, however the monster Godzilla has fought against many UFOs.

Books
 Oahspe: A New Bible - John Ballou Newbrough - First book to use the word Starship long before science-fiction writers conceived of interstellar space travel (1882).
 The War of the Worlds - H. G. Wells - Martian capsules are shot at Earth by aliens on Mars.(1898).
 Imaginary Friends (1967) - Alison Lurie - Two sociologists investigate a UFO cult.
 Saucer Wisdom (1999) - Rudy Rucker
 The Unreals, a novel by Donald Jeffries (2007).  https://web.archive.org/web/20100115010803/http://donaldjeffries.com/

Radio

"The War of the Worlds" a radio play by Orson Welles, caused all manner of panic in 1938

Films

1930s
 Flash Gordon - 1936
 Buck Rogers - 1939 - a.k.a. Planet Outlaws

1940s
 Flash Gordon Conquers the Universe - 1940 - a.k.a. Purple Death from Outer Space
 The Purple Monster Strikes - 1945 - a.k.a. D-Day on Mars
 Bruce Gentry - 1949 - Possibly contains the first cinematic appearance of a Flying Saucer

1950s
 Atom Man vs. Superman - 1950
 Flying Disc Man from Mars - 1950
 The Flying Saucer - 1950 - The first film to deal with Flying Saucers
 Captain Video: Master of the Stratosphere - 1951
 Mysterious Island - 1951
 The Man from Planet X - 1951
 The Day the Earth Stood Still - 1951
 The Thing from Another World - 1951
 1. April 2000 - 1952
 Blackhawk - 1952
 Operation: Rabbit - 1952
 The Hasty Hare - 1952
 Radar Men from the Moon - 1952
 Zombies of the Stratosphere - 1952 - a.k.a. Satan's Satellites
 Commando Cody: Sky Marshal of the Universe - 1953
 The Lost Planet - 1953
 The War of the Worlds - 1953
 Invaders from Mars - 1953
 It Came from Outer Space - 1953
 Phantom from Space - 1953
 Robot Monster - 1953
 Devil Girl from Mars - 1954
 Gog - 1954
 Killers from Space - 1954
 Stranger from Venus - 1954 - a.k.a. 'Immediate Disaster'
 The Beast with a Million Eyes - 1955
 This Island Earth - 1955
 Forbidden Planet - 1956
 Earth vs. the Flying Saucers - 1956
 Jungle Hell - 1956
 Supersonic Saucer - 1956
 宇宙人東京に現わる - a.k.a. 'Warning from Space' - 1956
 Unidentified Flying Objects: The True Story of Flying Saucers - 1956
 The Astounding She-Monster - 1957
 Invaders from Space - 1957 - a.k.a. 'Attack of the Flying Saucers'
 地球防衛軍 - a.k.a. 'The Mysterians' - 1957
 The 27th Day - 1957
 Invasion of the Saucer Men - 1957
 Kronos - 1957
 Enemy From Space - 1957 - a.k.a. 'Quatermass 2'
 Attack of the 50 Foot Woman - 1958
 The Blob - 1958
 Flying Saucer Daffy - 1958
 Hare-Way to the Stars - 1958
 I Married a Monster from Outer Space - 1958
 The Lost Missile - 1958
 The Strange World of Planet X - 1958
 War of the Satellites - 1958
 The Atomic Submarine - 1959
 The Cosmic Man - 1959
 Invisible Invaders - 1959
 Plan 9 from Outer Space - 1959
 Prince of Space - 1959
 Quatermass and the Pit - 1959
 Teenagers from Outer Space - 1959

1960s
 Battle in Outer Space - 1960
 Visit to a Small Planet - 1960
 Il pianeta degli uomini spenti - 'Battle of the Worlds' - 1961
 Invasion of the Neptune Men - 1961
 Planets Against Us - 1962
 Invasion of the Star Creatures - 1962
 The Creeping Terror - 1964
 Il disco volante - 'The Flying Saucer' - 1964
 Hercules Against the Moon Men - 1964
 Robinson Crusoe on Mars - 1964
 Santa Claus Conquers the Martians - 1964
 Frankenstein Meets the Space Monster - 1965
 Invasion of Astro-Monster - 1965 - a.k.a. 'Monster Zero' & 'Godzilla vs Monster Zero'
 Mars Invades Puerto Rico - 1965 - a.k.a. 'Duel of the Space Monsters' & 'Frankenstein Meets the Space Monster'
 The Night Caller - 1965 - a.k.a. 'Night Caller from Outer Space' & 'Blood Beast from Outer Space'
 Destination Inner Space - 1966
 The Eye Creatures - 1966 - remake of 'Invasion of the Saucer Men' (1957)
 Invasion - 1966
 Mars Needs Women - 1966
 Casino Royale - 1967
 Five Million Years to Earth - 1967 - remake of 'Quatermass and the Pit' (1959)
 The Ambushers - 1967
 The Terrornauts - 1967
 They Came from Beyond Space - 1967
 Destroy All Planets - 1968
 Kaijû sôshingeki - 'Destroy All Monsters' - 1968
 The Bamboo Saucer - 1968
 Goke, Body Snatcher from Hell - 1968
 Attack of the Giant Monsters - 1969
 The Incredible Invasion - 1969 - a.k.a. 'The Sinister Invasion'

1970s
 Night Slaves - 1970
 The People - 1971
 Invasion: UFO - 1972
 Silent Running - 1972
 Distant Early Warning - 1973
 The Disappearance of Flight 412 - 1974
 The Stranger Within - 1974
 UFO: Target Earth - 1974
 Escape to Witch Mountain - 1975
 The UFO Incident - 1975
 El hombre perseguido por un O.V.N.I. - 1976
 God Told Me To - 1976
 Laserblast - 1977
 Starship Invasions - 1977
 Close Encounters of the Third Kind - 1977
 Foes - 1977
 The Alien Factor - 1978
 Burû Kurisumasu - 1978
 The Day Time Ended - 1978
 Eyes Behind the Stars - 1978
 Return from Witch Mountain - 1978
 The Cat from Outer Space - 1978
 The Dark - 1979
 Le gendarme et les extra-terrestres - 1979

1980s
 The Aliens Are Coming - 1980
 Cheech & Chong's Next Movie - 1980
 Hangar 18 - 1980
 The Return - 1980 - a.k.a. 'The Alien's Return'
 Earthbound - 1981
 Heavy Metal - 1981
V (science fiction) series - 1980s
 Big Meat Eater - 1982
 E.T. the Extra-Terrestrial - 1982
 The Thing - 1982
 Wavelength - 1982
 Xtro - 1983
 Alien Prey - 1984
 The Last Starfighter - 1984
 Meatballs Part II - 1984 - a.k.a. 'Space Kid'
 Starman - 1984
 Strange Invaders - 1984
 Cocoon - 1985
 Miami Golem - 1985 - a.k.a. 'Miami Horror'
 Morons from Outer Space - 1985
 My Science Project - 1985
 Star Knight - 1985
 UFOria - 1985
 The Aurora Encounter - 1986
 Escapes - 1986
 Flight of the Navigator - 1986
 Hyper Sapien: People from Another Star - 1986
 Invaders from Mars - 1986
 Maximum Overdrive - 1986
 *batteries not included - 1987
 Predator - 1987
 Real Men - 1987
 Alien Nation - 1988
 Cocoon: The Return - 1988
 Invasion Earth: The Aliens Are Here - 1988
 It Came from Somewhere Else - 1988
 Killer Klowns from Outer Space - 1988
 Mac and Me - 1988
 My Stepmother Is an Alien - 1988
 They Live - 1988
 The Abyss -1989
 Communion - 1989

1990s
 Predator 2 - 1990
 Intruders (film) - 1992
 Invader - 1992
 XX Ray - 1992 - Malaysian science fiction film directed by Aziz M. Osman. One of the scenes in the film depicting UFOs
 Attack of the 50 Ft. Woman - 1993
 Fire in the Sky - 1993
 U.F.O. - 1993
 Official Denial - 1994
 The Puppet Masters - 1994
 Roswell - 1994
 Stargate - 1994
 Dead Weekend - 1995
 Visitors of the Night - 1995
 The Arrival - 1996
 Independence Day - 1996
 Mars Attacks! - 1996
 Night Visitors - 1996
 Phenomenon - 1996
 Dreamland - 1996 film won an award called "The EBE Award: Best UFO Documentary in 1996". Film made by a Bruce Burgess who also made Broken Dagger See www.digiview.com/Dreamland for more on this film
 Contact - 1997
 Invasion - 1997 - a.k.a. 'Robin Cook's Invasion'
 Men in Black - 1997
 The Shadow Men - 1998
 Alien Abduction: Incident in Lake County - 1998
 I Married a Monster - 1998 - remake of 'I Married a Monster from Outer Space' (1958)
 Progeny - 1998
 The X-Files: Fight the Future - 1998
 Sphere - 1998
 The Second Arrival - 1998
 Gojira ni-sen mireniamu - 'Godzilla 2000' - 1999
 Muppets from Space - 1999
 My Favourite Martian - 1999
 The Astronaut's Wife - 1999
 Roswell: The Aliens Attack - 1999
 Fantozzi 2000 - La clonazione - 1999

2000s
 Scooby-Doo and the Alien Invaders - 2000
 Mission to Mars - 2000
 K-PAX - 2001
 Groom Lake - 2002
 Men in Black II - 2002
 Signs - 2002
 Alien Hunter - 2003
 Koi Mil Gaya (Bollywood) - 2003
 Visitors - 2003
 Godzilla: Final Wars - 2004
 The Forgotten - 2004
 Alien Abduction - 2005
 War of the Worlds - 2005
 Alien Autopsy - 2006
 Flying Saucer Rock'n'Roll - 2006
 Lifted - 2006
 Dreamland - 2007
 Martian Child - 2007
 Night Skies - 2007
 Indiana Jones and the Kingdom of the Crystal Skull - 2008
 The Appearance of a Man - 2008
 The Day the Earth Stood Still - 2008 remake of the 1951 movie
 The Invasion - 2007
 Bolt - 2008
 Summer of the Flying Saucer - 2008
 The X-Files: I Want to Believe - 2008
 Alien Trespass - 2009
 District 9 - 2009
 Knowing - 2009
 Monsters vs. Aliens - 2009
 Race to Witch Mountain - 2009 remake of the 1975 movie
 The Fourth Kind - 2009
 Avatar - 2009

2010s
 Skyline - 2010
 Apollo 18 - 2011
 Battle: Los Angeles - 2011
 Cowboys & Aliens - 2011
 Mars Needs Moms - 2011
 Paul - 2011
 Super 8 - 2011
 Transformers: Dark of the Moon - 2011
 UFO in Her Eyes - 2011
 Battleship - 2012
 Prometheus - 2012
 U.F.O. - 2012
 The Avengers - 2012
Area 51 - 2015

2020s
 Nope - 2022

Television

UFOs in television programs fall into three basic categories: real UFOs, hoaxes, and misidentified terrestrial spacecraft (often landing in a backward rural area or traveling back in time as in Lost in Space and Star Trek).

Shows depicting real UFOs include: The Outer Limits, The Invaders, The Monkees, The Bionic Woman, Dark Skies, Roswell, Wonder Woman, V, and The X-Files.

Hoax stories include: Batman, The Beverly Hillbillies, The Brady Bunch, The Green Hornet, The Man from U.N.C.L.E., The Girl from U.N.C.L.E., Mission: Impossible, and The Wild Wild West (a hoax story with a real sighting at the end)

Earth ships mistaken for UFOs appear in: I Dream of Jeannie, The Munsters, Lost in Space, Star Trek: The Original Series, Star Trek: Deep Space Nine, and Gomer Pyle, U.S.M.C. (Pyle witnesses the location filming of a science fiction film).

Alphabetical Order

In video games

 Space Invaders (1978)
 Asteroids (1979)
 Choplifter (1982)
 Moon Patrol (1982)
 X-COM (1994)
 Area 51 (1995)
 Duke Nukem 3D (1996)
 Kirby (1998)
 Perfect Dark (2000)
 Destroy All Humans! (2005)
 Microsoft Flight Simulator X (2006)
 Halo: Combat Evolved (2001)
 The Sims 2 (2004)
 Deus Ex (2000)
 The Sims 3: Seasons (2012)
Fortnite Chapter 2: Season 7  (2021)

See also
 1947 flying disc craze
 Ancient astronauts in popular culture
 Extraterrestrial life
 Ufology
 Project Blue Book
 The Twilight Zone
 Disclosure Project
 UFO

References

UFO
Fiction
Science fiction|UFO
Science fiction themes